Clearwater Yacht Club is a yacht club located in Clearwater, Florida (United States). The club belongs to the Florida Council of Yacht Clubs, and the Florida Sailing Association.

History 
The club's charter and by-laws were officially registered on 14 February 1911.

Snipe fleet number 46, based at the club, was very strong in the 1930s and first hosted the Midwinter Snipe Championship Regatta in 1935, and has been raced ever since with the exception of the war years.

Clark Mills was also the builder of Snipe "Honey", winner of the United States Snipe National Championship in 1951 with Francis Seavy and Howard McGaughey.

CYC hosted the 1960 United States Snipe National Championship.

References

External links 
 Official website

1911 establishments in Florida
Sailing in Florida
Yacht clubs in the United States
Sports in Clearwater, Florida
Buildings and structures in Clearwater, Florida